During the eighteenth century, there were several attempts to describe a "women's literary tradition." This table compares six eighteenth-century collections of notable women: George Ballard's Memoirs of several ladies of Great Britain (1752), John Duncombe's The Feminead (1754), the Biographium Faemineum (Anon., 1766), Mary Scott's The Female Advocate (1775), Richard Polwhele's The Unsex'd Females (1798), and Mary Hay's Female Biography (1803).

Collective 18th-century biographies of literary women

As the focus of this chart is British literary figures, broadly defined, two of the texts have been treated selectively because of their wider range. Three of these texts are collective biographies, while three of them are more pointed political interventions in contemporary debates about women's roles. Three are poems and three are dictionaries, but they all list, and comment on, women and their accomplishments.

NB: In the columns, readers can find subjects' names or pseudonyms as presented in the text. A number in front of a name indicates the relative position of that name in the text. Users may reorder some elements of the table.

Texts
 . Vol. II is available online at HathiTrust.

Notes

See also
Biography

List of biographical dictionaries of women writers in English
Women's writing (literary category)
Wikisource: Biographical dictionaries

References

External links
Collective Biographies of Women, U of Virginia

Biographical dictionaries of women
Lists of women writers
18th-century women writers